Caroline Garcia was the defending champion, but was defeated in the final by Ekaterina Alexandrova, 6–4, 6–0.

Seeds

Main draw

Finals

Top half

Bottom half

External Links
 Main draw
 Qualifying draw

Open de Limoges - Singles
Open de Limoges